Husein Beganović (born 16 June 1971) is a retired Macedonian footballer of Bosniak descent, who last played for FK Sloga Jugomagnat.

International career 
He made his senior debut for Macedonia in an October 1996 FIFA World Cup qualification match against Ireland and has earned a total of 4 caps, scoring no goal. His final international was a November 2001 friendly match against Hungary.

References

External sources

1971 births
Living people
Macedonian people of Bosnia and Herzegovina descent
Association football defenders
Macedonian footballers
North Macedonia international footballers
FK Sloga Jugomagnat players
R.W.D. Molenbeek players
ND Gorica players
FK Belasica players
Macedonian First Football League players
Belgian Pro League players
Slovenian PrvaLiga players
Macedonian expatriate footballers
Expatriate footballers in Belgium
Macedonian expatriate sportspeople in Belgium
Expatriate footballers in Slovenia
Macedonian expatriate sportspeople in Slovenia
Macedonian football managers
FK Sloga Jugomagnat managers